Surprise Lake is a freshwater body of the southeastern portion of Eeyou Istchee James Bay (municipality), in the administrative region of Nord-du-Québec, in the province of Quebec, in Canada.

The "Surprise Lake" straddles the townships of Druillettes, Langloiserie, Hazeur and Pambrun, on the territory of the Eeyou Istchee James Bay (municipality) regional government, south of Chapais, Quebec.

Forestry is the main economic activity of the sector. Recreational tourism activities come second, notably thanks to various navigable water bodies located in the area.

The hydrographic slope of "Surprise Lake" is accessible via the R1009 (North-South) and R1053 (East-West) forest roads serving the western part of the lake, the strip of land separating the Father Lake (Doda Lake) and the Surprise Lake. Route 1032 (North-South direction) serves the west side of the lake.

The surface of Surprise Lake is generally frozen from early November to mid-May, however, safe ice circulation is generally from mid-November to mid-April.

Geography

Toponymy
This hydronym was formalized on November 18, 1935, by the Quebec Geography Commission. In 2018, the toponymy of Quebec counts 29 hydronyms named "lakes Surprise". These homonymous lakes, of various sizes and shapes, have in common that they are located in mountainous and northern regions. The origin of this toponymic designation may have been attributed to the surprise effect of the first travelers who used to ride in canoes this complex body of water to explore it as well as upstream streams.

The toponym "Lake Surprise" was made official on December 5, 1968, by the Commission de toponymie du Québec, when it was created.

Notes and references

See also 

Eeyou Istchee James Bay
Lakes of Nord-du-Québec
Nottaway River drainage basin